Whites Pond is a  lake in Plymouth, Massachusetts, south of Big Sandy Pond, north of Little Sandy Pond and Little Rocky Pond, and east of Ezekiel Pond. The Ponds of Plymouth, a large residential development, lies to the east of the pond.

External links
Environmental Protection Agency

Lakes of Plymouth, Massachusetts